Eric Edwards may refer to:
 Eric Edwards (actor) (born 1945), American former adult film star
 Eric Edwards (American football) (born 1980), National Football League tight end
 Eric Edwards, Baron Chelmer (1914–1997), British Conservative party activist
 Eric Edwards (Neighbours), fictional character from the Australian soap opera Neighbours